Ford Nation: Two Brothers, One Vision – The True Story of the People's Mayor is a 2016 biography by Toronto politicians Doug Ford Jr. and Rob Ford.

Synopsis
The book documents the career of Toronto mayor Rob Ford and his councillor brother Doug from their perspective. Development of the book began prior to Rob Ford's death in March 2016.

Publication
The book was released on 22 November 2016.

See also
Crazy Town: The Rob Ford Story

References

External links
 Ford Nation at HarperCollins

2016 non-fiction books
Canadian autobiographies
Biographies about politicians
Political autobiographies
HarperCollins books
Culture of Toronto
Rob Ford